Dulcot is a rural residential locality in the local government area (LGA) of Clarence in the Hobart LGA region of Tasmania. The 2016 census recorded a population of 235 for the state suburb of Dulcot.

History 
Dulcot was gazetted as a locality in 1970. Dulcott (with 2 t’s) was a township name in the area by 1845.

Geography
Belbin Rivulet forms the south-eastern boundary.

Road infrastructure 
Route B31 (Richmond Road) passes through the eastern extremity of the locality.

References

Towns in Tasmania
Localities of City of Clarence